Bermondsey is a district in southeast London, part of the London Borough of Southwark, England,  southeast of Charing Cross. To the west of Bermondsey lies Southwark, to the east Rotherhithe and Deptford, to the south Walworth and Peckham, and to the north is Wapping across the River Thames.   It lies within the historic county boundaries of Surrey. During the Industrial Revolution Bermondsey became a centre for manufacturing, particularly in relation to tanning. More recently it has experienced regeneration including warehouse conversions to flats and the provision of new transport links.

History

Toponymy
Bermondsey may be understood to mean Beornmunds island; but, while Beornmund represents an Old English personal name, identifying an individual once associated with the place, the element "-ey" represents Old English eg, for "island", "piece of firm land in a fen", or simply a "place by a stream or river". Thus Bermondsey need not have been an island as such in the Anglo-Saxon period, and is as likely to have been a higher, drier spot in an otherwise marshy area. Though Bermondsey's earliest written appearance is in the Domesday Book of 1086, it also appears in a source which, though surviving only in a copy written at Peterborough Abbey in the 12th century, claiming "ancient rights" unproven purporting to be a transcription of a letter of Pope Constantine (708–715), in which he grants privileges to a monastery at Vermundesei, then in the hands of the abbot of Medeshamstede, as Peterborough was known at the time.

Anglo-Saxon and Norman period

Bermondsey appears in the Domesday Book as Bermundesy and Bermundesye, in the Hundred of Brixton within the County of Surrey. It was then held by King William, though a small part was in the hands of Robert, Count of Mortain, the king's half brother, and younger brother of Odo of Bayeux, then earl of Kent. Its Domesday assets were recorded as including 13 hides, 'a new and handsome church', 5 ploughs,  of meadow, and woodland for 5 pigs. It rendered £15 in total. It also included interests in London, in respect of which 13 burgesses paid 44d (£0.18).

The church mentioned in Domesday Book was presumably the nascent Bermondsey Abbey, which was founded as a Cluniac priory in 1082, and was dedicated to St Saviour. Monks from the abbey began the development of the area, cultivating the land and embanking the riverside. They turned an adjacent tidal inlet at the mouth of the River Neckinger into a dock, named St Saviour's Dock after their abbey. But Bermondsey then was little more than a high street ribbon (the modern Bermondsey Street), leading from the southern bank of the Thames, at Tooley Street, up to the abbey close.

The Knights Templar also owned land here and gave their names to one of the most distinctive streets in London: Shad Thames (a corruption of "St John at Thames"). Other ecclesiastical properties stood nearby at Tooley Street (a corruption of "St Olave's"), owned by the priors of Lewes, St Augustine's, and Canterbury, as well as the abbot of Battle. These properties are located within the Archbishop of Canterbury's manor of Southwark, where wealthy citizens and clerics had their houses.

14th century
King Edward III built a manor house close to the Thames in Bermondsey in 1353. The excavated foundations are visible next to Bermondsey Wall East, close to the famous Angel public house.

Early Modern period

As it developed over the centuries, Bermondsey underwent some striking changes. After the Great Fire of London, it was settled by the well-to-do, and took on the character of a garden suburb especially along the line of Grange Road and Bermondsey Wall East as it became more urbanised. A pleasure garden was constructed during the Restoration period in the 17th century, commemorated by the Cherry Garden Pier. Samuel Pepys once visited here.

A rare surviving building from this period is St Mary Magdalen Church in Bermondsey Street, completed in 1690 (although a church has been recorded on this site from the 13th century). This church survived the 19th-century redevelopment phase and the Blitz unscathed. It is an unusual survivor for Bermondsey as buildings of this period are relative rarities in Inner London in general.

In the 18th century, the discovery of a spring from the river Neckinger in the area led to the development of Bermondsey Spa, as the area between Grange and Jamaica Roads called Spa Road commemorates. A new church was built for the growing population of the area, and named St John Horsleydown.

Industrial era 

It was from the Bermondsey riverside that the painter J.M.W. Turner executed his famous painting of The Fighting "Temeraire" Tugged to her Last Berth to be Broken Up (1839), depicting the veteran warship being towed to Rotherhithe to be scrapped.

By the mid-19th century, parts of Bermondsey, especially along the riverside, had become notorious slums with the arrival of industrial plants, docks and immigrant housing. The area around St. Saviour's Dock, known as Jacob's Island, was one of the worst in London. It was immortalised in Charles Dickens's novel Oliver Twist, in which the villain, Bill Sikes, meets his end in the mud of 'Folly Ditch', in reference to Hickman's Folly, which surrounded Jacob's Island. Dickens provides a vivid description of what it was like:

Bermondsey vestry hall was built on Spa Road in 1881 but blitzed in 1941. The original vestry hall was extended to create the Bermondsey Town Hall in 1930. The area was extensively redeveloped during the 19th century and early 20th century with the expansion of the river trade and the arrival of the railways. London's first passenger railway terminus was built by the London to Greenwich Railway in 1836 at London Bridge. The first section to be used was between the Spa Road Station and Deptford High Street. This local station had closed by 1915.

The industrial boom of the 19th century was an extension of Bermondsey's manufacturing role in earlier eras. As in the East End, industries that were deemed too noisome to be carried on within the narrow confines of the City of London had been located here — one such that came to dominate central Bermondsey, away from the riverfront, was the processing and trading of leather and hides. Many of the warehouse buildings from this era survive around Bermondsey Street, Tanner Street, Morocco Street and Leathermarket Street including the huge Leather Market of 1833 and the Leather, Hide and Wool Exchange of 1878; virtually all are now residential and small work spaces or offices. Hepburn and Gale's tannery (disused as of early 2007) on Long Lane is also a substantial surviving building of the leather trade. The Exchange building had a fine private club, effectively a gentlemen's club for the leading merchants and manufacturers. In 1703 they had acquired a royal charter from Queen Anne to gain a monopoly of trading and training of apprentices for within  of the ancient parish, similar to a City livery company, the Bermondsey Tanners.

Peek, Frean and Co was established in 1857 at Dockhead, Bermondsey by James Peek and George Hender Frean. They moved to a larger plant in Clements Road in 1866, leading to the nickname 'Biscuit Town' for Bermondsey, where they continued baking until the brand was discontinued in 1989.

Bermondsey, specifically Blue Anchor Lane, was also the location of the world's first food canning business, established in 1812, by Donkin, Hall and Gamble.

20th century

To the east of Tower Bridge, Bermondsey's  of riverside were lined with warehouses and wharves, of which the best known is Butler's Wharf. They suffered severe damage in World War II bombing and became redundant in the 1960s following the collapse of the river trade. After standing derelict for some years, many of the wharves were redeveloped under the aegis of the London Docklands Development Corporation during the 1980s. They have now been converted into a mixture of residential and commercial accommodations and have become some of the most upmarket and expensive properties in London. In 1997, US President Bill Clinton and Prime Minister Tony Blair visited the area to dine at the Le Pont de la Tour restaurant at Butler's Wharf.

At the same time more everyday housing was constructed in the areas north of the Old Kent Road, including several council estates.

Bermondsey was served by London's first railway, from Spa Road railway station, as part of the London Bridge to Greenwich line, and the junction of lines from Croydon and Kent at South Bermondsey. However, reorganisation of lines and temporary closure of stations left Bermondsey's transport links with the rest of London poorer in the late Twentieth Century. This was improved in 2000 with the opening of Bermondsey Underground station on the London Underground's Jubilee Line Extension and the East London Line extension as part of the London Overground.  

The Blue serves as the central market place for Bermondsey as a whole.

Wee Willie Harris, known as "Britain's wild man of rock 'n' roll", came from Bermondsey and had worked as a pudding mixer at Peek Freans. He is usually credited as the first British rock and roll player.

Local government

The first 'Bermondsey' is that known as the location of an Anglo-Saxon monastery, and known from later charters to be the area around the post-Conquest Bermondsey Abbey and its manor, which was in turn part of the medieval parish. References in the Parliamentary Rolls describe it as "in Southwark".[] A later, Victorian civil parish of Bermondsey did not include Rotherhithe or St Olave's; this was the arrangement under the Metropolis Management Act of 1855. The Southwark parishes of St Olave's and St John's Horsleydown (the latter a 'daughter' of the former) with St Thomas's formed a parish union ('District Board of Works') known as 'St Olave's' from that date. This was the arrangement within the London County from 1889. In 1899 St Olave and St Thomas's District was created as a single civil parish and the next year, following London government reorganisation, this was merged with Rotherhithe and part of Deptford to form, with Bermondsey civil parish, the Metropolitan Borough of Bermondsey. The Borough's first Mayor was Samuel Bourne Bevington (1832–1907), leather producer and one of the area's largest employers; his statue still stands in Tooley Street. This Borough disappeared into the London Borough of Southwark, in the Greater London reorganisation of 1964.

Governance

Southwark London Borough Council has divided the borough into a number of community council areas. The wards of London Bridge and West bermondsey, North Bermondsey and South Bermondsey form the Bermondsey Community Council area.

Bermondsey's parliamentary representation has fluctuated with its population. Since at least the 13th century, it had formed part of the Surrey County seat until the 1868 Reform Act when it became part of Southwark constituency. From 1885 to 1918, a separate Bermondsey constituency existed, which included part of the older Southwark constituency. 1918 saw the seat split between two new constituencies: Rotherhithe and Bermondsey West, both of which were in place until the 1950 general election when the old Bermondsey seat was recreated.

In 1983, the area played host to the famous Bermondsey by-election in which Labour's Peter Tatchell lost the previously safe Labour seat to the Liberal Simon Hughes on a swing of 44%, which even now remains the largest by-election swing in British political history. Hughes represented the area until 2015 when he was defeated by the Labour candidate Neil Coyle. At the 1983 general election that took place several months after the by-election, a new Southwark and Bermondsey constituency was created, becoming North Southwark and Bermondsey in 1997, and in 2010 Bermondsey and Old Southwark (although a small part of south east Bermondsey is transferred to Camberwell and Peckham in the 2010 changes).

Sport
Millwall Football Club was originally formed in 1885, in Millwall on the Isle of Dogs, East London. They retained the name, even though they moved across the river to New Cross, South East London in 1910. In 1993 they moved to their current stadium, The Den. The team has a strong local following, but has never been based in Bermondsey. The stadium lies right on the border of Southwark, but falls under the Borough of Lewisham. The nearest railway station is at South Bermondsey, which is a five-minute walk away.

Geography

Places of interest
Maltby Street Market
Bermondsey antiques market
 Fashion and Textile Museum
 Shad Thames
 Mandela Way T-34 Tank
 Miloco Studios
 Bermondsey Spa Gardens
 Kagyu Samye Dzong, Tibetan Buddhist Centre
 Millwall F.C.
 HMS Belfast
 Tower Bridge

Nearest places
 City of London
 Whitechapel
 Borough
 Peckham
 Canary Wharf
 Deptford
 Poplar
 Rotherhithe
 New Cross
 Wapping
 Camberwell
 Walworth

Transport

Rail 
There are several railway stations in and around Bermondsey. Bermondsey is in London Zone 2, but nearby London Bridge and Borough stations are in travelcard Zone 1. Oyster Cards can be used for travel from stations in Bermondsey to other stations in the London region.

London Underground 
The Jubilee line passes through Bermondsey, calling at Bermondsey and Canada Water stations. London Bridge station on the Jubilee and Northern lines, and Borough on the Northern line are also nearby.

The Jubilee line provides a direct link from Bermondsey to Canary Wharf and Stratford in London's East End, and to Waterloo, the West End, Baker Street and north west London towards Willesden and Stanmore. The Northern line from London Bridge links the area to Kennington, Clapham and Morden in the south west. Northbound services travel through the City of London, King's Cross St Pancras and Camden Town, towards Edgware or High Barnet.

National Rail & London Overground 
The East London Line, South London Line and South Eastern Main Line all pass through Bermondsey, providing frequent rail connections to Central London and South East England.

London Bridge is the busiest station in the locale, and fourth busiest station in the UK, with 48.5 million passenger entries and exits in 2017–18. Services from London Bridge are provided by Southeastern, Thameslink and Southern. London Bridge connects Bermondsey directly to destinations in Central London, including Waterloo, Charing Cross, Cannon Street, Farringdon and St Pancras International. Beyond London, trains travel direct to Gatwick and Luton airports, and destinations including Bedford, Brighton, Cambridge, Dover, Peterborough and Sevenoaks.

South Bermondsey is served by Southern trains from London Bridge to South London, with direct connections to Beckenham Junction, Crystal Palace and Croydon.

Rotherhithe, Canada Water and Surrey Quays are all served by London Overground trains. These stations link Bermondsey with  Dalston and Highbury & Islington to the north. To the south, Bermondsey is linked directly to New Cross, West Croydon, Crystal Palace, and Clapham Junction.

Queens Road Peckham & Peckham Rye stations, just south of Bermondsey, Peckham Rye is also an interchange served by London Overground, Southeastern, Thameslink and Southern, with direct trains to London Victoria station. While Queens Road Peckham station is in-between Peckham Rye and South Bermondsey stations providing London Overground and Southern services.

Bus connections

London Buses routes 1; 42; 47; 78; 188; 381; C10 and P12 and night routes N1; N47; N199 and N381 all serve the Bermondsey and South Bermondsey area.

Road 
Several of London's arterial routes pass through Bermondsey, including:

 the A100 (Tower Bridge Road) - the London Inner Ring Road towards the City and Tower Bridge;
 the A101 (Rotherhithe Tunnel) - to Limehouse, Canary Wharf, the A13 and destinations in Essex;
 the A2 (Great Dover Street/Old Kent Road) - to the M25, destinations in Kent and the Channel Tunnel;
 the A200 (Jamaica Road/Lower Road) - to London Bridge and Deptford;
 the A202 (New Kent Road) - the London Inner Ring Road towards Elephant & Castle and the A3;
 the A2206 (Southwark Park Road);
 the A2208 (Rotherhithe New Road).

Bricklayer's Arms is a busy road junction between the London Inner Ring Road (A100/A202) and the A2, where routes from London Bridge meet with routes towards the East End, Surrey and Kent.

The southern portal of the Rotherhithe Tunnel (A101) is in Bermondsey. The Tunnel was completed in 1908 and carries vehicle traffic from Bermondsey directly to the East End. In 2003, the Tunnel was rated the tenth most dangerous tunnel in Europe, owing in parts to its age and lack of safety features.

The London Borough of Southwark maintains most roads, particularly residential streets, but Transport for London (TfL) manages certain routes: the A100; the A101 (Rotherhithe Tunnel); the A2; the A200; the A202.

Air pollution 
The local authority say that vehicle exhaust fumes are the main source of air pollution in Southwark. Roadside air pollution levels are monitored by the local authority in Bermondsey. Results from 2017 suggest that Bermondsey has some of the highest Nitrogen Dioxide (NO2) levels in the Borough. NO2 concentration was particularly high near the Rotherhithe Tunnel, along Jamaica Road and on Old Kent Road:

All the above sites failed to meet national air quality objectives.

A monitoring site on Old Kent Road registered an annual mean 22 μg/m-3 in 2017 for PM10 (particulates often found in exhaust), which meets national air quality objectives.

Cycling 
Bermondsey is well connected to the London and National Cycle networks, with several signed routes passing through the area. With several routes passing through Bermondsey, cycling infrastructure is maintained by both Transport for London (TfL) and Southwark Council. Most routes run through Bermondsey in an east–west direction.

Santander Cycles bicycle sharing was extended to the area in 2020 with five new docking stations,  serving the Cycleway 4 route that will  connect Tower Bridge and Greenwich.

See also
List of people from Southwark
List of schools in Southwark
Bermondsey Market

References

External links

Southwark London Borough Council – Bermondsey

 
Areas of London
Districts of London on the River Thames
Districts of the London Borough of Southwark
Port of London